Tomás Pérez Guerra (ca. 1766 – ca. 1846) was Mayor of Ponce, Puerto Rico, from 1 January 1826 to 31 December 1826.

Mayoral term
On 31 August 1826, during the midst of mayor Pérez Guerra's mayoral term, a slave revolt in Ponce against the slave owners in Ponce was discovered and the slaves were condemned to death. The Provincial Military Governor of Puerto Rico, Miguel de la Torre, traveled to Ponce to witness the mass shooting. The 11 slaves shot dead were named as follows: Francisco Jose, Federico, Benito, Pablo Viejo, Oguis, Jose Felix (from Barrio El Quemado), Faustino (also from Barrio El Quemado), Francisco Antonio, Don Esteban Miguel Roque's Francisco Antonio and Manuel, and Don Wedestein's Inés. There are no Acts in the Municipality for the period from 1824 to 1834, affecting the period while Pérez Guerra was mayor.

See also

 List of Puerto Ricans
 List of mayors of Ponce, Puerto Rico

References

Further reading
 Ramon Marin. Las Fiestas Populares de Ponce. Editorial Universidad de Puerto Rico. 1994.

External links
 Guardia Civil española (c. 1898) (Includes military ranks in 1880s Spanish Empire.)

Mayors of Ponce, Puerto Rico
1760s births
1840s deaths
Year of death uncertain
Year of birth uncertain